A special defence in Scots law may be raised in criminal proceedings upon notice by the accused ahead of the trial. If established, it results in an acquittal. The only purpose of the special defence procedure is to give fair notice: it does not prejudice the plea of not guilty by an accused; the Crown still must prove the acts charged beyond a reasonable doubt.

Notice given 
In solemn proceedings (prosecutions on indictment of more serious criminal offences before a judge and jury of 15 persons) notice of a special defence must be given at least 10 days before the trial date and the jury is advised of the special defence immediately after the indictment has been read (or summarised) and each juror is given a copy of the accused's notice.

Types of special defence
The types of special defence are: mental disorder (when the offence was committed or before the trial), incrimination (alleging someone else committed the crime), coercion, automatism, self-defence, consent (under some circumstances), or alibi.

Notes and references

Further reading 
 Criminal Procedure (Scotland) Act 1995 (UK)
 For special defences in solemn business, see s 78 and s 89, Criminal Procedure (Scotland) Act 1995;
 For special defences for a summary provision, see s 149B, Criminal Procedure (Scotland) Act 1995.

Scottish criminal law
Scots law legal terminology